Patuletin is an O-methylated flavonol. It can be found in the genus Eriocaulon.

Glycosides 
Patuletin glycosides can be found in Ipomopsis aggregata.

Patuletin-3-O-rutinoside can be isolated from the aerial parts of Echinacea angustifolia.

Patuletin acetylrhamnosides can be isolated from Kalanchoe brasiliensis.

References 

O-methylated flavonols